Paradise is an unincorporated community in northwest Clay County, in the U.S. state of Missouri. The community lies between the two arms of the Smithville Lake on the Little Platte River. The city of Smithville lies across the lake to the southwest. The community is located along Missouri Route W about four miles southeast of Trimble in adjacent Clinton County.

Demographics

History
In 1832, the US Government deeded  of land at this location to Mr. Pleasant Gentry. The land was sold in 1850 to John Gosney, who surveyed the land. The developing town was named "Gosneyville". Gosneyville was renamed "Paradise" circa 1884.

A post office called Paradise was established in 1858, and remained in operation until 1907. The community was so named for the many churches in town relative to its small size.

In popular culture
Paradise was featured in the 1998 film The Dentist 2. In the film the titular dentist, Doctor Alan Feinstone, travels to Paradise after escaping the psychiatric hospital he was being held in after the events of the first film.

References

Unincorporated communities in Clay County, Missouri
Unincorporated communities in Missouri